Three ships of the Royal Navy have been named HMS Dumbarton Castle after Dumbarton Castle.

 , originally of the Royal Scots Navy, was a frigate taken into the Royal Navy in 1707.
She was built in 1944 and saw service in the North Atlantic before being placed into reserve in 1946 before being scrapped.

Battle honours
 Atlantic 1944-45
 South Atlantic 1982

Royal Navy ship names